The women's 10,000 metres at the 2018 European Athletics Championships took place at the Olympic Stadium on 8 August.

Meraf Bahta who finished 3rd was later disqualified and Alina Reh was promoted to bronze medal.

Records

Schedule

Results

Final

References

10,000 W
10,000 metres at the European Athletics Championships
Euro